"Don't Get Comfortable" is a song by Christian contemporary-alternative rock musician Brandon Heath from his first studio album, Don't Get Comfortable. It was released in 2007, as the third and last single from the album.

Background 
This song was produced by Dan Muckala.

Composition 
"Don't Get Comfortable" was written by Brandon Heath and Phillip LaRue.

Release 
The song "Don't Get Comfortable" was digitally released as the third and final single from Don't Get Comfortable in 2007.

Charts

Weekly charts

References 

2007 singles
Brandon Heath songs
Songs written by Brandon Heath
2006 songs
Songs written by Phillip LaRue